"The War on Poverty: 50 Years Later" is a report by the Budget Committee of the United States House of Representatives published on March 3, 2014. It was published in recognition of the 50th anniversary of Lyndon B. Johnson's 1964 State of the Union address, in which he declared "an unconditional war on poverty in America".

Report 
The reports advances the argument that federal antipoverty programs suffer from defects that “penalize families for getting ahead” and that  “the complex web of federal programs and sudden drop-off in benefits create extraordinarily high effective marginal tax rates,” both of which “reduce the incentive to work”. 

At the core of the report are recommendations to enact cuts to welfare, child care, college Pell grants and several other federal assistance programs. In an appendix titled "Measures of Poverty", when the poverty rate is measured by including non-cash assistance from food stamps, housing aid and other federal programs, the report states that these measurements "[have] implications for both conservatives and liberals. For conservatives, this suggests that federal programs have actually decreased poverty. For liberals, it lessens the supposed need to expand existing programs or to create new ones."

Reception 

Several economists and social scientists,  Amy Finkelstein, Jane Waldfogel, Chris Wimer, Jeffrey Brown and Barbara Wolfe, whose work had been referenced in the report said that Paul Ryan, the committee's chairman, either misunderstood or misrepresented their research. One of the issues raised was that the report cites data from 1969 onward, and according to Waldfogel this ignores a full 36 percent of the decline in poverty using the Supplemental Poverty Measurement since 1967. Brown stated after the article's publication that Ryan quoted his research accurately, and that the Fiscal Times misrepresented his comments. The Financial Times later updated the article based on Brown's comment. All of the statistical errors were later corrected, and Waldfogel's criticism was fixed.

Report contents 

 Introduction
 Chapter 1: Cash Aid
 Chapter 2: Education and Job Training
 Chapter 3: Energy
 Chapter 4: Food Aid
 Chapter 5: Health Care
 Chapter 6: Housing
 Chapter 7: Social Services
 Chapter 8: Veterans
 Appendix I: Measures of Poverty 
 Appendix II: Data

See also 
 War on Poverty

References 

Paul Ryan
Poverty in the United States
2014 documents
Reports of the United States government